This page is a partital list of listed Grade II on the National Heritage List for England in the London Borough of Waltham Forest.

|}

See also
 Grade II* listed buildings in the London Borough of Waltham Forest

Notes

External links
 

 
Lists of Grade II listed buildings in London